Daruchini Dwip is a Bangladeshi Bengali-language film. It was released on 31 August 2007 throughout Bangladesh. The film is based on the Bangladeshi novelist and film maker Humayun Ahmed’s popular novel of the same name. It was directed by popular actor - director Tauquir Ahmed. Daruchini Dwip stars Riaz, Fazlur Rahman Babu, the award-winning Zakia Bari Momo, Abul Hayat, Asaduzzaman Noor, Dolly Johur, Challenger, Rahmat Ali, Wahida Mollick Jolly and Abdullah al Mamun. The film marks the debut film of Momo, Emon, Bindu, and Munmun.

The film was appreciated by film critics and won the National Film Award of Bangladesh Best Film of the Year 2007 and was nominated in seven categories also won all of them. It also won Best Foreign Language Film at the 2010 Bali International Film Festival Awards in Indonesia.

Plot
A team of young boys and girls plan to have a big trip across Bangladesh.The main protagonist of the fim is Shuvro. They all hail from the mega city of Dhaka. In Bangladesh, being a conservative country, it is not common to the sight of a group consisting of both young, single men and women traveling together. Yet in this story, the girls are seen to try to make it against the stream. Each had a different destination in mind: like Sundarban, Cox's Bazar, St. Martin's Island and many more places. Finally they decide to go to Daruchini Dwip. Shuvro (Riaz) has a big problem for his weak eyesight because he may be put out from the program. But finally the full team goes on a train with Shuvro.

Cast
 Riaz – Shuvro
 Zakia Bari Momo – Jori
 Mosharraf Karim – Ayon / Boltu
 Emon – Shonju
 Bindu – Anushka
 Munmun – Muna
 Abul Hayat – Shonju's father
 Afroza Banu – Shonju's mother Farida 
 Abdullah al Mamun – Shuvro's father
 Dolly Johur – Shuvro's mother
 Rahmat Ali – Jori's uncle
 Shirin Alam – Jori's aunt
 Asaduzzaman Noor – Anushka's father
 Fazlur Rahman Babu – Monir
 Challenger – Jori's father
 Wahida Mollick Jolly – Jori's mother

Awards and achievement

International awards 
 Winner Best Foreign Language Film: Bali International Film Festival Awards 2010 Indonesia.

National Film Awards
Daruchini Dwip won the National Film Awards total seven categories in the year of 2007.
 Winner Best Film 'Impress Telefilm Ltd.' 2007
 Winner Best Actor: 'Riaz' 2007
 Winner Best Actress: 'Zakia Bari Momo' 2007
 Winner Best Music Director 'S I Tutul' 2007
 Winner Best Choreographer: 'Kabirul Islam Ratan' 2007
 Winner Best Side Role Actor: 'Abul Hayat' 2007
 Winner Best Scriptwriter: 'Humayun Ahmed' 2007

Meril Prothom Alo Awards

Music

The music for Daruchini Dwip was directed by S I Tutul.

Soundtrack

References

External links
 
 

2007 films
2007 romantic comedy-drama films
Bengali-language Bangladeshi films
Bangladeshi romantic comedy-drama films
Films based on Bangladeshi novels
Films scored by S I Tutul
Films directed by Tauquir Ahmed
2000s Bengali-language films
2007 comedy films
2007 drama films
Best Film National Film Award (Bangladesh) winners
Films whose writer won the Best Screenplay National Film Award (Bangladesh)
Films shot in Cox's Bazar
Impress Telefilm films